The Tank is a line of watches made by Cartier. It was created by Louis Cartier in 1917, and inspired by the new Renault tanks which Cartier saw in use on the Western Front. The prototype watch was presented by Cartier to General John J. Pershing of the American Expeditionary Force.

History
The Tank was introduced in 1918, and entered full production in 1919, when six pieces were built. Its lines and proportions are similar to those of tanks used on First World War battlefields. Its strap is integrated into vertical sidebars called brancards. Since its inception, variations of the watch have been released by Cartier, including the Tank Louis in 1922, the Tank Americaine in 1989, and the Tank Française in 1996. The defining features of a Tank watch include its bold Roman numeral dial with a chemin de fer chapter ring, sword-shaped blued steel hands, and a sapphire cabochon-surmounted crown.

The Tank has become one of the most highly coveted and copied wristwatches of all time, and has been worn by, amongst others, Jackie Kennedy, Princess Diana and Yves Saint Laurent.

References

Further reading 

 
 

Watch models
Products introduced in 1917
Cartier